Alice Panikian (born May 23, 1985) is a Bulgarian-Canadian journalist, TV host, model and beauty pageant titleholder who was crowned Miss Universe Canada 2006 and Miss Reinado Internacional del Cafe 2006. She attended William Lyon Mackenzie Collegiate Institute in Toronto, and graduated in 2003.

At 6'0" (1.83 m) she is not only the tallest major national titleholder in Canadian history, but also had earned a significant amount of attention from the world press as one of the strongest candidates to succeed to then-reigning Miss Universe, Natalie Glebova, also from Canada. As no country has ever won the title back-to-back (later achieved by Dayana Mendoza and Stefanía Fernández in 2009, both of them from Venezuela), Panikian had a significant historical hurdle to jump despite many pundits who argue that she was an even stronger candidate than her predecessor. Panikian did not become Miss Universe 2006 (that honour went to Zuleyka Rivera of Puerto Rico), but she did finish in sixth place. She is the last Canadian representative to place at the Miss Universe until 2016.

Panikian enjoys writing short stories, and her hobbies include volleyball and yoga.

Panikian is of Bulgarian and  Armenian ancestry, which comes through her paternal grandfather and accounts for her Armenian surname. She came to Canada with her parents when she was five years old. Panikian studied at York University and majored in English and   Communications. She studied broadcast journalism and resides in Toronto, Ontario, and aspires to be a journalist or a TV show  host.

Before becoming Miss Universe Canada, Panikian represented Canada at the 2006 Reinado Internacional del Café or International Queen of Coffee pageant, held in Manizales, Colombia on January 9, where she became the first Canadian winner in the history of the pageant.

She also took the "Miss Photogenic" and "Best in Swimsuit" awards at the Miss Universe Canada Pageant.

Panikian was supposed to represent Canada and compete at Miss International 2007 held in Tokyo, Japan, but due to schedule conflicts in university, she did not compete. Justine Stewart took her place.

References

External links
Official site
Interview with Alice
http://www.fashionmodeldirectory.com/models/alice_panikian, Fashion model directory
http://james-valone.livejournal.com/6363.html

1985 births
Living people
Bulgarian emigrants to Canada
Bulgarian people of Armenian descent
Female models from Ontario
Canadian people of Armenian descent
Miss Universe 2006 contestants
Miss Universe Canada winners
Naturalized citizens of Canada
People from Toronto
Canadian beauty pageant winners